James Stewart "Jim" Thayer (born May 25, 1949) is an author of thriller novels and an attorney. His first six novels were written under his full name, but since then his middle name is not used.

Early life
Thayer was born in Eugene, Oregon. His father was a farmer. He is a graduate of Washington State University where he was inducted into the honors fraternity Phi Beta Kappa. Subsequently he graduated from the University of Chicago Law School.

Career
He is a member of the Washington State Bar Association. He has also been a creative writing instructor at the University of Washington. He is a regular contributor to Author magazine.

Personal life
Thayer resides in Seattle, Washington. He is married and has two daughters, Alex and Annemarie. He also has two other brothers living in Seattle, Joe and John, and one sister, Connie.

Written works
 The Hess Cross,  Putnam, 1977
 The Stettin Secret,  Putnam, 1979
 The Earhart Betrayal,  Putnam, 1980
 Pursuit, Crown Publishers, 1986
 Ringer,  Crown Publishers, 1988
 S-Day: A Memoir of the Invasion of England,  St. Martin's Press, 1990
 White Star  Published in the (USA) by Simon & Schuster 1995 and also published by Macmillan (UK) in the same year in paperback
 Five Past Midnight,  Simon & Schuster, 1997
 Man of the Century,  Donald I. Fine Books, 1997
 Terminal Event,  Simon & Schuster, 1999
 Force 12,  Simon & Schuster, 2001
 The Gold Swan,  Simon & Schuster, 2003
 "Fatty and Duke", The Weekly Standard, 21 July 2006.
 The Boxer and the Poet: Something of a Romance, Black Lyon Publishing, March 2008
 House of Eight Orchids, Thomas & Mercer, 2016

References

 Anderson, Patrick. "What Goes Up", Washington Post, November 11, 2002, p. CO2.
 Callendar, Newgate. "Spies and Thrillers", New York Times Book Review, March 26, 1995, p. 27.

External links
  Official website
 Fantastic Fiction's page on Thayer

20th-century American novelists
21st-century American novelists
American male novelists
Writers from Seattle
1949 births
Writers from Eugene, Oregon
Living people
Lawyers from Seattle
Lawyers from Eugene, Oregon
20th-century American male writers
21st-century American male writers
Novelists from Washington (state)
Novelists from Oregon